Typhloscolecidae is a family of polychaetes belonging to the order Phyllodocida.

Genera:
 Acicularia Langerhans, 1877
 Nuchubranchia Treadwell, 1928
 Plotobia Chamberlin, 1919
 Sagitella Wagner, 1872
 Travisiopsis Levinsen, 1885
 Typhloscolex Busch, 1851

References

Polychaetes